Jason Roberts may refer to:

 Jason Roberts (author), American writer
 Jason Roberts (footballer) (born 1978), Grenadian football (soccer) player
 Jason Roberts (guitarist) (born 1982), American guitarist
 Jason Roberts (indie musician), member of indie pop band The Happy Bullets
 Jason Roberts, fiddler in country music group Asleep at the Wheel
 Jason Roberts (weightlifter), Australian weightlifter
 Jason Joseph Roberts, a Melbourne man accused of slaying two police offers in the Silk–Miller police murders in Victoria, Australia

See also
 Jason Robards (1922–2000), American stage, film and television actor
 Jason Robards Sr. (1892–1963), American stage and screen actor
 Justin Roberts (born 1979), wrestling ring announcer, occasionally uses the name Jason Roberts